Chapmanslade is a village and civil parish in the county of Wiltshire, in the southwest of England. The parish is on the county border with Somerset and includes the hamlets of Huntenhull Green, Short Street  and Thoulstone.

Features
The village High Street is a section of the A3098 between Westbury and Frome and is some 2 km long. Near the centre of the village are the village school and the Anglican parish church.

The parish includes the site of Thoulstone Park Golf Club and Hotel, which closed in 2001 and (as of 2016) awaits refurbishment or redevelopment. The site has been used for events such as the Sunrise Celebration.

History
The civil parish of Chapmanslade was established in 1934 from parts of Corsley, Dilton Marsh and Upton Scudamore parishes. Prior to this, the village High Street formed the boundary between Corsley (historically part of Warminster) and Dilton Marsh (historically part of Westbury).

The name Chapmanslade has referred to the village since the 14th century at least.  A '' was a travelling merchant or pedlar, and a '' was a valley or glade. The principal local industries were weaving and agriculture, but the employment profile of the village is now very similar to Southern England generally.

Religious sites

The Church of England parish church of St Philip and St James was built in 1866–7 to designs of G.E. Street, in the Gothic Revival style. The interior has its original fittings, designed by Street and of high quality, with stained glass by Clayton and Bell. Originally a chapel of ease to Dilton Marsh church, the district was transferred to Corsley ecclesiastical parish in 1924, which now forms part of the Cley Hill benefice.

A Congregational gathering was formed at Chapmanslade in 1761, and built a chapel in 1771. In the mid-19th century a disagreement between minister and congregation caused the entire congregation to join the Baptists at their chapel. A new chapel, a stone building in Gothic style, was built in the east end of the village in 1867. In the later 20th century this building was sold and became a private house.

Particular Baptists came to Chapmanslade in 1777 and built a chapel in brick and stone on Wood Lane, north of the High Street. Sometime in the 20th century this too became a private house.

Amenities 
The village's primary school is next to the church and was designed by the same architect, G.E. Street. It opened in 1872 as a National School, was enlarged in 1894 and has a further modern extension. Control passed to the county council in 1906 and the school has Voluntary aided status.

The village has a pub, the Three Horseshoes.

Governance
Most local government services are provided by Wiltshire Council, which has its offices in Trowbridge. Chapmanslade also has its own elected parish council of five members, which is almost entirely a consultative body.

The village is represented in Parliament by the MP for South West Wiltshire, Andrew Murrison, and in Wiltshire Council by Fleur de Rhé-Philipe.

Notable people
Clara Grant (1867–1949), educational pioneer and social reformer, was born in the village.

Kate French, modern pentathlon gold medallist at the 2020 Tokyo Olympics for Great Britain and Northern Ireland, lives in the village.

References

External links

 Village website

Villages in Wiltshire
Civil parishes in Wiltshire